Acacia pubicosta is a tree or shrub belonging to the genus Acacia and the subgenus Phyllodineae native to north eastern Australia.

Description
It has branchlets that are densely covered in soft, fine, silvery white and straight hairs set close against the surface and glabrous towards the extremities. Like many species of Acacia it has phyllodes rather than true leaves. The midrib is not prominent and the lateral nerves are inconspicuous.

Taxonomy
It is closely related to Acacia polifolia and they both have some affinity with Acacia hamiltoniana.

Distribution
It is endemic to south eastern Queensland around Biggenden and is also present on the Blackland tableland where it is found on steep rocky slopes and hilly terrain growing in stony and sandy soils. It is usually a part of woodlands, shrublands or heathland communities mostly in rocky areas or pavements. Associated species of trees found with A. pubicosta include Eucalyptus crebra, Eucalyptus acmenoides and Corymbia citriodora.

See also
 List of Acacia species

References

pubicosta
Flora of Queensland
Plants described in 1939